Euphorbia croizatii is a species of plant in the family Euphorbiaceae. It is endemic to Madagascar.  Its natural habitat is subtropical or tropical dry forests. It is threatened by habitat loss.

References

Endemic flora of Madagascar
croizatii
Endangered plants
Taxonomy articles created by Polbot